This is a list of African-American newspapers that have been published in Alaska. All of them have been published in Anchorage, the state's largest city.

The first African American newspaper in the Territory of Alaska (1912-1959) was The Alaska Spotlight, which began publication in 1952 when Alaska was not yet a state.

Newspapers

See also
List of African-American newspapers and media outlets
List of African-American newspapers in Hawaii
List of newspapers in Alaska

Works cited

References

Newspapers
Alaska
African-American
African-American newspapers